C. striatus may refer to:
 Conus striatus, the striated cone, a sea snail species
 Cyathus striatus, the fluted bird's nest, a common saprobic fungus species with a widespread distribution throughout temperate regions of the world
 Cytisus striatus, the Portuguese broom, a flowering plant species native to the Iberian Peninsula

See also